David Wang may refer to:

David Wang (Australia) (1920–1978), first Chinese Australian elected to the Melbourne City Council
David Der-wei Wang (born 1954), scholar of Chinese literature
David Wang (hacker), jail break developer and mobile phone hacker
Dave Wang (born 1962), singer-songwriter
Wang Yaoqing or David Wang (born 1974), Taiwanese actor
David Wang (footballer) (born 2000), Chinese footballer

See also
David Wong (disambiguation)